The upland burrowing tree frog (Smilisca dentata)  is a species of frog in the family Hylidae. It is endemic to Mexico and occurs in southeastern Aguascalientes and adjacent northern Jalisco at elevations of  asl. Its natural habitats are flooded grasslands where it breeds in temporary and permanent pools.
It is a rare species that is threatened by habitat loss caused by conversion into agricultural land and the subsequent pesticide pollution.

References

Smilisca
Endemic amphibians of Mexico
Mexican Plateau
Frogs of North America
Endangered fauna of North America
Endangered biota of Mexico
Amphibians described in 1957
Taxonomy articles created by Polbot